Oualid Ardji (born September 7, 1995) is an Algeria footballer who plays for CS Constantine in the Algerian Ligue Professionnelle 1. He plays primarily as an attacking midfielder.

Honours

Club
 USM Alger
 Algerian Ligue Professionnelle 1 (1): 2018–19

References

External links
 

1995 births
Algerian footballers
Algerian Ligue Professionnelle 1 players
Living people
NA Hussein Dey players
People from Algiers
USM Alger players
Footballers from Algiers
Association football midfielders
21st-century Algerian people